The 4th Marine Regiment is an infantry regiment of the United States Marine Corps. Based at Camp Schwab in Okinawa, Japan, it is part of the 3rd Marine Division of the III Marine Expeditionary Force.

Mission
Close with and destroy the enemy by fire and maneuver, or repel the
enemy's assault by fire and close combat.

Current units
The regimental Headquarters Company is based at Camp Schwab, Okinawa, and hosts Marine infantry battalions from across the Corps that forward deploy to Okinawa and the 3rd Marine Division for six-month rotations under the Unit Deployment Program.

 Headquarters Company at Camp Schwab, Okinawa.

Currently each of the Regiment's three organic infantry battalions are reinforcing other Marine infantry regiments in the 1st Marine Division.

 1st Battalion, 4th Marines: attached to 1st Marine Regiment at Camp Pendleton, California.
 2nd Battalion, 4th Marines: attached to 5th Marine Regiment at Camp Pendleton.
 3rd Battalion, 4th Marines: attached to 7th Marine Regiment at Twentynine Palms, California.

History

Early years
The 4th Marine Regiment was first activated on 16 April 1914, in Puget Sound, Washington, & Mare Island, California Naval Yards, under the command of Colonel Joseph Henry Pendleton. This activation was a direct result of deteriorating relations between the United States and Mexico. On 21 April, President Woodrow Wilson ordered U.S. Naval Forces to Vera Cruz. Shortly after activation, 4th Marines embarked upon the  headed for San Francisco. Upon their arrival they received four companies (the 31st, 32nd, 34th and 35th) which were to become attached to the regiment. The regiment then sailed for Mexico.

On 28 April, 4th Marines arrived in Acapulco harbor. Reinforcements subsequently arrived in Mazatlán a week and half later. The regiment continued to maintain a presence in Mexican waters patrolling the shore through May and June. However, by the end of June no landing had been deemed necessary and tensions had eased between Mexico and the United States. Shortly thereafter 4th Marines withdrew from Mexican waters and concluded their first Latin American expedition. The regiment returned to San Diego to establish its new home base. Between this time and February 1916 the regiment conducted several missions of force projection off the coast of Mexico. None had required the Marines to actually disembark as diplomatic relations were subsequently smoothed over upon their arrival or shortly thereafter.

The Dominican Republic broke out in civil war in the spring of 1916. American forces were sent to quell the danger posed to Americans and other foreigners there. As the Americans came ashore the rebels withdrew from Santo Domingo, the capital, to Santiago where they had established another rival government. American forces called for reinforcements and 4th Marines was called into action. They left San Diego on 6 June for New Orleans.

China Marines

Disorder and civil war that had long been troubling China flared in the mid 1920s with the foreign community in Shanghai, where fighting between opposing Chinese forces became active, demanding a more permanent protective force. The embarked 3d Battalion, commanded by then Major Alexander Vandegrift, was held aboard the transport at State Department direction until a declaration of emergency by the Municipal Council of the international Settlement was declared on 21 March. Once landed the Marines, shortly came under the command of Brigadier General Smedley Butler as Marine Corps Expeditionary Force, United States Asiatic Fleet. They joined forces of seven other nations in the internal defense of the settlement, with orders to not come into conflict with Chinese troops. They were not deployed to the perimeter barricades though they did support international forces that were so deployed. By June additional forces, including 2d Battalion, 4th Marine Regiment as part of a newly activated Provisional Regiment, had arrived in China and been sent to Tientsin. By the time that force arrived the threat to the international settlement in Shanghai had eased and the combined forces of the American, British, Dutch, French, Italian, Japanese, Portuguese, and Spanish were seen as sufficient.

The 4th Marine Regiment was reduced in strength in October 1927 with the 2d Battalion at Tientsin becoming 2d Battalion, 12th Marines and the Provisional Regiment dissolved. The 4th regiment settled into routine garrison duty during which it gained the nickname "China Marines" and a unique feature, the only fife and drum corps in the Corps. The formation of the Fessenden Fifes was a result of influence of the American chairman of the Shanghai Municipal Council and Civil Commandant of the Shanghai Volunteer Corps, Stirling Fessenden, and instruments from the 1st Battalion, Green Howards whose fifers and drummers taught the Marines to play. Reductions continued and on 14 January 1928 the 4th Regiment was detached from the withdrawing Marines of the brigade and on 13 February 1930 the regiment gained its designation as 4th Marines.

The quiet was ended in January 1932 when Japanese forces in Manchuria began seizing Chinese territory in late 1931 and bloody clashes between Chinese and Japanese civilians erupted in Shanghai that month. The 4th Marines were deployed to prevent fighting from spilling into the International Zone. On 3 March 1932 an agreement was reached between combatants, the state of emergency in the International Zone was ended 13 June 1932 and the 4th Marines returned to garrison duty while the 31st Infantry returned to the Philippines. The Commander in Chief, Asiatic Fleet, recommended the 4th Marines be brought up to full strength and a new 2d Battalion was activated 18 September 1932 bringing the unit for the first time in five years to a full three battalion strength until deactivation of the 3d Battalion 19 December 1934. Garrison duty was interrupted during the few tranquil following years only by duty aboard vessels of the Yangtze Rapid Steamship Company November 1933 – July 1935 protecting the ships from pirates on voyages into the interior.

The commanding officer of 4th Marines, then Colonel John C. Beaumont, was one of only two people in China, the other being the naval attaché in Beijing, Commander Thomas M. Shock, to know the actual mission William A. Worton was undertaking for the Office of Naval Intelligence in attempting to penetrate Japan with agents from China. Worton, who had served as a Marine in China 1922—1926, 1927–1929, and 1931–1935 and been commended for his intelligence work by General Butler during Butler's 1927–1929 command of the 4th, arrived during the summer of 1935 to recruit and run agents until his turn over and return to the United States in  June 1936.

The peaceful years ended 7 July 1937 when Japanese incursions resulted in an incident at the Marco Polo Bridge used by Japan to send more troops into China. After Japanese military personnel were killed in Shanghai Japanese warships were sent to the city with landing of troops and movement of Chinese troops into the city. The 4th Marines were deployed with orders to prevent either side from entering the American sector "by means other than rifle fire." Again the 4th Marines were reinforced, this time by the 2d Marine Brigade under Brigadier General John C. Beaumont, the units former commanding officer, to which the 4th Marines were attached.

Fighting around the city ended with Japanese forces in full control and the 2d Marine Brigade less the 4th Marines was withdrawn 17 February 1938 leaving these "China Marines" alone to deal with Japanese interests now trying to undermine the Western powers in the International Zone. Their position was compromised by the fact other Western foreign powers had also reduced their forces and by war in Europe in 1939 in which Italy was aligned with the Axis with Japan and Germany, France by June was defeated and ordered by the Vichy Government to cooperate with Japan and the British withdrew due to war needs elsewhere—leaving the 4th Marines alone to oppose Japanese ambitions.  The unit had been further reduced by separations from the service with replacements diverted at the direction of the 4th's commander to the 1st Special Defense Battalion in the Philippines so that it consisted of only two battalions, each with only two rifle companies of two platoons each and one machine gun company.

World War II

Withdrawal from China

The United States began considering complete withdrawal and Commander in Chief, Asiatic Fleet, Admiral Thomas C. Hart began withdrawal of units along the coast and recommended withdrawal of the 4th Marines as he felt war was inevitable.

Sometimes associated with 4th Marines is the paleontological and anthropological mystery of loss of the Peking Man fossils. The Chinese authorities requested the United States ambassador's help in evacuating the fossils and the custodians records indicate the fossils were crated and taken to the United States Legation in Peking. There a detachment of Marines, sometimes associated with the 4th but actually the Legation Guard Marines from Peking and Tientsin (North China Marines), were to escort the crates to the Marine compound at Tienstin and evacuated aboard President Harrison which was to evacuate remaining military and civilians. The Japanese attack on Pearl Harbor came between the arrival of the crates at the Legation and the rest of the plan's execution. President Harrison had completed the first evacuation of 4th Marines and was headed back leaving Manila on 4 December for Chingwangtao (Qinhuangdao) to evacuate about 300 Legation Guard Marines from Peking and Tientsin but the ship was shadowed by Japanese forces and eventually ordered to stop. The Legation Marines were taken prisoner and the crates with the fossils disappeared into the chaos of the war. The question of what happened to the crates of fossils is one of the frequent and unanswerable questions posed to the Marine Corps historians.

The Philippines

The 4th Marines absorbed the Marine Barracks Olongapo on 22 December 1941 to fill out the 1st and 2nd Battalions to three rifle companies of three platoons each, then added the 1st Separate Marine Battalion  at Cavite to create the 3rd Battalion.

The 4th Marines then were moved to Corregidor where on 10 April 1942 it added the Provisional Naval Battalion as the regiment's 4th Battalion. The 4th Battalion was composed of U.S. Navy personnel that had previously served during the Battle of Bataan.  Most of the battalion's sailors were crew members of the disabled submarine tender USS Canopus.

When the Japanese defeated allied forces in Bataan on 9 April 1942, they shifted their focus to Corregidor Island.
The island was essential to the invading Japanese forces, as it was the last remaining obstacle to Manila Bay, known as the finest harbor in the Orient.

The regiment was composed of troops from 142 different U.S. and Filipino organizations with nearly 4,000 men with the regiment occupied the island at the time, but more than half were Army and Navy personnel without ground combat training. Approximately 1,500 U.S. Army and Philippine Scouts personnel reinforced the regiment during the defense of Corregidor, designated as the Reserve Battalion.

On 5 May, Japanese soldiers landed on the island and faced fierce resistance from American and Filipino artillery, but with persistence the Japanese forces etched their way deeper into allied territory and eventually overcame one of the regiment's artillery batteries. Early the next day, Japanese tanks made it to shore.

Army Lt. Gen. Jonathan Wainwright, the commander of U.S. forces in the Philippines under Gen. Douglas MacArthur, realized his men's defeat was imminent. Just a day after the invasion, he surrendered for fear that the more than 1,000 wounded troops would be captured or killed. The 4th Marine Regiment was utterly destroyed, and only a few surviving Marines and personnel made up what was left of the regiment. The regiment was subsequently dissolved under control of its own accord. The commander of 4th Marines ordered the burning of the colors before they made their hasty evacuation.

Rebirth
By 1 February 1944, four Marine Raiders battalions were amalgamated into a re-established 4th Marine Regiment, bearing the name and honors of the original 4th Regiment lost in the Philippines in 1942. The 1st, 4th, and 3rd Raider Battalions became respectively the 1st, 2nd, and 3rd Battalions, 4th Marines. The 2nd Raider Battalion became the regimental weapons company. 4th Marines, combined with the 22nd Marine and the 29th Marine Regiment, was assigned to the 6th Marine Division and fought at Guam and Okinawa.

Following the surrender of Japan, the 4th Marines were assigned to guard the Japanese Navy Base at Yokosuka near Tokyo.  The 4th Marines performed this duty from 2 September 1945 to 14 February 1946 when the 6th Marine Division was deactivated, also dissolving the regiments under its operational command.

Korean War

In 1951 the 4th Marines were reactivated at Camp Pendleton, carrying lineage of both the old and new 4th Regiments.  The regiment was assigned to the 3rd Marine Division and moved to Japan in 1952 where it remained until after the Korean Armistice Agreement was signed on 27 Jul 1953.  The 4th Marines were sent to Korea on 23 August 1953 to defend South Korea in the event hostilities resumed and returned to the Japan on 27 July 1954.  Although they saw no combat, the 4th Marines are entitled to fly the Korean Service streamer from their regimental colors.

When the 3rd Marine Division relocated to Okinawa in 1955, the 4th Marines moved to Marine Corps Base Hawaii where they remained until being deployed to Vietnam in 1965.

Vietnam War

The 4th Marines served in the I Corps region of South Vietnam as part of the 3rd Marine Division, under the III Marine Amphibious Force. They landed in the spring and summer of 1965 near Chu Lai. The regimental headquarters was first at Da Nang, then in 1966 the HQ was moved to Phu Bai. In 1967 the regiment made its final move to Đông Hà, just below the Demilitarized Zone (DMZ). There the regiment participated in many large operations throughout Quang Tri Province from the South China Sea to the Laotian Border along the southern half of the DMZ. During this period of time the 4th Marines were also providing security for the construction of the McNamara Line. Some of the major operations that the regiment was involved in were Operation Starlite ( 17–24 August 1965), Operation Hastings (15 July – 3 August 1966) and Operation Prairie (3 August – 27 October 1966). Other major operations in 1967 and 1968 were Operation Prairie IV (20 April – 17 May 1967), Operation Hickory ( 18–28 May 1967), Operation Kingfisher (16 July – 31 October 1967) and Operation Kentucky (1 November 1967 – 28 February 1969). The two major enemy units they battled over those years were the 324B NVA Division and the 320th NVA Division. The regiment left South Vietnam in November 1969 with 10 Marines and 1 Hospital Corpsman having received the Medal of Honor.

Okinawa
In 1972 the 4th Marines were sent to Okinawa to serve as part of the 3rd Marine Division.  Except for operational deployments, the 4th Marines have served in Okinawa through 2019.

Gulf War

During the Gulf War (1990 to 1991) 2nd Battalion, 4th Marines was attached to the 8th Marines as part of the 2nd Marine Division.  In March 1991 it participated in the Liberation of Kuwait as part of Operation Desert Storm.

Unit awards
A unit citation or commendation is an award bestowed upon an organization for the action cited. Members of the unit who participated in said actions are allowed to wear on their uniforms the appropriate ribbon of the awarded unit citation. 4th Marines have been awarded the following:

See also

 China Marines
 Organization of the United States Marine Corps
 List of United States Marine Corps regiments

Footnotes

Notes

References

Bibliography

 

Web

 4th Marines official website
 James S. Santelli. A BRIEF HISTORY OF THE 4TH MARINES. Historical Division Headquarters, U. S. Marine Corps, Washington, D.C. 20380, 1970
 China Marines website
 Surviving members of the 4th Marines dine with new members immediately after WWII
 4th Marine Chapter-American Defenders of Bataan and Corregidor

External links 
 

Infantry04
Military units and formations established in 1914
Infantry units and formations of the United States Marine Corps
1914 establishments in Washington (state)
1914 establishments in California
United States military in the Philippines